Westphalian or Westfalish (Standard High German: ,) is one of the major dialect groups of West Low German. Its most salient feature is its diphthongization (rising diphthongs). (There is also a difference in the use of consonants within the Westphalian dialects: North of the Wiehengebirge, people tend to speak unvoiced consonants, south of the Wiehengebirge they voiced their consonants, e.g.  > .)

The Westphalian dialect region includes the north-eastern part of North Rhine-Westphalia, i.e. the former Prussian province of Westphalia, without Siegerland and Wittgenstein, but including the southern part of former government district Weser-Ems (e.g. the region around Osnabrück and the landscape of Emsland in modern Lower Saxony).

Traditionally, all Dutch Low Saxon dialects are considered Westphalian, with the notable exception of Gronings, which is grouped with the Northern Low Saxon and Friso-Saxon dialects. The rising diphthongisation is still noticeable in the dialects of Rijssen, Enter and Vriezenveen.

Varieties 
Among the Westphalian language there are different subgroups of dialects:
 Westmünsterländisch
 Münsterländisch
 South Westphalian
 East Westphalian in East Westphalia (including the dialect of Osnabrück)

Westphalian dialects in the Netherlands:
 Drents
 Urkers
 Stellingwarfs
 Sallands
 Twents
 Achterhoeks
 Veluws

Westphalian has many lexical similarities and other proximities to Eastphalian, extending to the East and slightly to the North of the area where Westphalian is spoken.

Grammar

Personal pronouns
The personal pronouns in Störmede are as follow:

Status

German Westphalian is currently spoken mostly by elderly people. The majority of the inhabitants of Westphalia proper speak (regionally coloured) standard German. This accent, however, does not stand out as much as for example Bavarian, because Westphalia is closer to the Hanover region, whose speech variety is generally considered to be standard modern German.

The Low Saxon dialects in the bordering Twente and Achterhoek regions in the east of the Netherlands are traditionally classified as Westphalian dialects, albeit with some notable traits from Standard Dutch. A 2005 study showed 62% of the population of Twente spoke the language daily, and efforts are made to insert the language into the local school curriculum.

One of the reasons for the diminishing use of Westphalian in Germany is the rigorous enforcement of German-only policies in traditionally Low German-speaking areas during the 18th century. Westphalian, and Low German in general, unlike many of the High German dialects, were too distant from standard German to be considered dialects and were therefore not tolerated and efforts were made to ban them. In an extreme case, Hannover and its hinterland were forced to adopt rather unnaturally a form of German based on the written standard.

Westphalian was spoken in Kruppwerke up to the 19th century.

Nevertheless, the Westphalian regiolect of Standard High German includes some words that originate from the dying Westphalian dialects, which are otherwise unintelligible for other German speakers from outside Westphalia. Examples include Pölter  "pyjamas/pajamas", Plörre  "dirty liquid", and Mötke  "mud, dirt".

References

Dutch dialects
German dialects
Languages of Germany
Languages of the Netherlands
Low German
Westphalian dialects
North Rhine-Westphalia